The 2004 Indiana gubernatorial election took place on November 2, 2004, to elect the Governor of Indiana.

Incumbent Democratic Governor Joe Kernan was defeated by Republican Mitch Daniels. Daniels' victory was the first time the Republican Party had been elected governor since 1984, and gave the party control of all the important statewide offices. It was also the first time an incumbent governor had been defeated since the Constitution of Indiana was amended in 1972 to permit governors to serve two consecutive terms.

Primaries

Republican 
Former White House Director of the Office of Management and Budget Mitch Daniels easily defeated conservative activist Eric Miller in the Republican primary on May 4, 2004. The Republican candidate for governor in 2000, David M. McIntosh, had earlier dropped out of the race after President George W. Bush gave his support to Daniels. Daniels had quit as White House budget director in 2003 so he could return to Indiana and run for governor. President Bush came to South Bend, Indiana before the primary to support Daniels, and the President's nickname for Daniels, "My Man Mitch", became his campaign slogan.

Democratic
Frank O'Bannon had been re-elected governor of Indiana in 2000 and was prevented from running for governor again by term limits. His lieutenant governor, Joe Kernan, on December 15, 2002 said that he would not be a candidate for governor. State Senator Vi Simpson and Joe Andrew then vied for nomination for the next ten months. However, on September 13, 2003, O'Bannon had a stroke and died, resulting in Kernan taking over as governor. Kernan decided two months later, on November 4, 2003, that he would run for governor in 2004 and was unopposed in the Democratic primary after both Simpson and Andrew dropped out.

General election

Campaign 

Daniels campaigned by traveling throughout Indiana in his RV visiting all 92 Indiana counties at least three times. Kernan fell behind in the polls in May 2004 and never caught up, despite closing the gap in September after attacking Daniels' plan to sell an Indiana utility to an out of state firm. The economy of Indiana was a major issue in the campaign with Kernan, as incumbent, facing pressure over the state’s budget troubles.

In addition to the two major party tickets, there was the Libertarian ticket of Kenn Gividen and Elaine Badnarik.

All three candidates took part in two debates during the campaign. The first was held on September 28, 2004 at Franklin College with the candidates clashing over the state's economy, prescription drugs and the extension of Interstate 69 from Indianapolis to Evansville. The second debate was held on October 17, 2004 in New Albany, Indiana. Negative campaigning was the major issue.

Between Daniels and Kernan the two candidates raised over 28 million dollars, easily surpassing the previous record set in 2000 of 19.2 million dollars.

Predictions

Polling

Statewide Results

County Results
Kernan won 17 of Indiana's counties compared to 73 for Daniels. The candidates finish tied in 2 counties.

Notes

References

See also
Advance America - Political lobbying organization run by Eric Miller

Indiana
2004
Gubernatorial